Soy como soy (English I am just the way I am) is the 15th studio album by Mexican pop singer, Ana Gabriel. It was released on 1999. This material shows her firmly planted in the pop music, guided by the masterful hand of producer Emilio Estefan Jr. Gabriel composed some of the songs, with collaborations by Estefan himself, as well as renowned pop composer Kike Santander. It was recorded at Crescent Moon Studios, Miami, Florida.

Track listing
Tracks:
 Lo Sé 04:11
 Si Me Faltarás 03:48
 No A Pedir Perdón 03:50
 Obsesión 03:38
 Siempre Tú 04:45
 Porqué Volviste 03:26
 Sólo Quiero Ser Amada 03:30
 Me Haces Falta 04:34
 Soy Como Quise Ser 03:27
 Claro De Luna 02:52

Album Charts

 Note: This release reached the #9 position in Billboard Latin Pop Albums staying for 7 weeks  and it reached the #19 position in the Billboard Top Latin Albums staying for 10 weeks in the chart.

Singles
 Si Me Faltaras reached #30 on Hot Latin Tracks and #32 on Latin Pop Airplay.
 No A Pedir Perdón

Sales and certifications

References

1999 albums
Ana Gabriel albums